Edward Kelly may refer to:

Sports
Ed Kelly (baseball) (1888–1928), American baseball player
Edward I. Kelly Sr. (1921–2004), American racehorse trainer
Ed Kelly (born 1948), Irish and American soccer player
Eddie Kelly (boxer) (1885–1944), featherweight boxing contender from Buffalo, New York
Eddie Kelly (footballer) (born 1951), Scottish footballer
Edward Kelly (cricketer) (1932–1998), English cricketer

Politics
Ed Kelly (Illinois politician, born 1924), American politician, General Superintendent of the Chicago Park District
Edward Joseph Kelly (1876–1950), American politician and mayor of Chicago
Edward Kelly (Irish nationalist politician) (1883–1944), Irish Parliamentary Party MP from Donegal
Edward Kelly (Monaghan politician) (1883–1972), Irish Fianna Fáil politician from Monaghan
Edward A. Kelly (1892–1969), U.S. Representative from Illinois

Religion
Edward D. Kelly (1860–1926), American bishop
Edward Wendall Kelly (1880–1964), American bishop of the Methodist Church
Edward Kelly (bishop) (1890–1956), American Roman Catholic clergyman

Other
Edward J. Kelly (died 1877), alleged member of the 19th-century Irish-American Molly Maguires
Ned Kelly (1854–1880), Australian bushranger and folk hero
Edward Kelly (painter) (born 1946), British painter
Edward J. Kelly (1897–1958), former superintendent of National Capital Parks, Washington, DC, after whom a park is named

See also
Edward Kelley (disambiguation)